Fort Road is a discontinuous street in Edmonton, Alberta, Canada. Historically it was a major route in connecting Edmonton and Fort Saskatchewan. It was formed on the west side of the Canadian National Railway line that formerly connected the two cities, and crossed the North Saskatchewan River just south of the current Highway 15 bridge. As the city of Edmonton expanded its grid street system, and realigned the highway to Manning Drive, portions of Fort Road ceased to exist.

At the intersection of Fort Road and 66th street stands the Transit Hotel, which opened in 1908. This is in the Village of North Edmonton, annexed by the City of Edmonton in 1912.

Fort Road is divided into three major sections: 
the southern section between 112 Avenue northeast to Wayne Gretzky Drive is a collector road through established residential neighbourhoods; 
the central section between Wayne Gretzky Drive, Yellowhead Trail and 137 Avenue is a 4-6 lane arterial road, where it is the northern continuation of Wayne Gretzky Drive and is a continuation of Manning Drive, which ends at Yellowhead Highway at 50th Street; and 
the northern section north of 153 Avenue is a rural road segmented by Anthony Henday Drive, finally terminating at 227 Avenue, near Manning Drive. (Manning Drive at this point continues to the northeast on the line of the old Fort Road.)

Nearby Victoria Trail is built on a different trail that also was part of the Carlton Trail network. Where Victoria Trail ends, at 153 Avenue, Fort Road is nearby.

Another portion of the historic Fort Trail exists in Sturgeon County. Old Fort Trail comes off Manning Drive not far from where Fort Road terminated at 227 Avenue. It runs to the former crossing of the North Saskatchewan River into Fort Saskatchewan. The 1905 bridge was replaced for car traffic by a new bridge built in 1957 and then finally dismantled in the late 1980s. The bridge's piers still stand in the river, near the end of Old Fort Trail.

Major intersections
This is a list of major intersecting streets, starting at the south end of Fort Road.

See also 

 Transportation in Edmonton

References

Roads in Edmonton